The 3rd Saturn Awards were awarded to media properties and personalities deemed by the Academy of Science Fiction, Fantasy and Horror Films to be the best in science fiction, fantasy and horror released in the year 1974 and 1975. They were awarded on January 31, 1976.

For this ceremony, eight new categories were introduced, including four for acting and Best Director; although they were all juried winners with a single individual, expect for a tie for Best Actor.

Below is a complete list of nominees and winners. Winners are highlighted in bold.

Winners and nominees

References

External links
 Official website
 3rd Saturn Awards at IMDb

Saturn Awards ceremonies
Saturn
Saturn